The four teams in this group would play against each other once. The group winner and runner-up would qualify for the 1938 FIFA World Cup held in France.

Group 1

Matches

Sweden vs Finland

Sweden vs Estonia

Finland vs Germany

Finland vs Estonia

Germany vs Estonia

Germany vs Sweden

Team stats

Head coach:  Sepp Herberger

Head coach:  Carl Linde

Head coach:  Bernhard Rein

Head coach:  Ferdinand Fabra

External links
 1938 FIFA World Cup qualification at RSSSF.com

1
1936–37 in Swedish football
1936–37 in German football
1937–38 in Swedish football
Qual
1937 in Finnish football
1937 in Estonian football
Qual